The 1410s decade ran from January 1, 1410, to December 31, 1419.

Significant people

References